Aird is a village in the Scottish council area of Eileanan Siar (Western Isles). It is located on the Eye Peninsula on the east coast of the Isle of Lewis. Aird is within the parish of Stornoway, and is situated on the A866 near the northern end of the road.

There is a shop/post office. Until it closed in 2011, superseded by Point primary school, Aird Primary School served the local area including the villages of Portvoller, Portnaguran, Broker and Flesherin.

Aird is also the location of the annual Point Show, held in July each year.

References

External links

Canmore - Lewis, Aird site record

Villages in the Isle of Lewis